Michael Jackson: One is the second Michael Jackson-based production in Cirque du Soleil's roster, after Michael Jackson: The Immortal World Tour. It was announced to the public and media on February 21, 2013. In their continuing partnership with the Jackson estate, One evokes the entertainer's artistic style in several manners. The new production began previews on May 23, 2013 and the official world premiere was June 29, 2013 at the Mandalay Bay on the Las Vegas Strip in Paradise, Nevada. Like The Immortal World Tour, this production was also written and directed by Jamie King. "Sneak peek" videos were released on the internet revealing numbers of the production, including "2 Bad", "Stranger in Moscow", "Bad", and "Smooth Criminal". However, unlike Immortal, the show only uses prerecorded tracks, with no live orchestra. This show is also the most dance-driven Cirque du Soleil show.

The show
The show's plot is centered on four "misfits" who set out on a journey into Michael Jackson's world and music. By journey's end, they personify Jackson's agility, courage, playfulness and love. These values are represented with his white gloves, white socks and black shoes, hat and sunglasses.

Each of four main characters receives an object from Jackson. First, Clumsy is given the shoes, and with his newfound balance, performs a double slackline act to "Bad." Next, Shy overcomes her name when she receives Jackson's glasses, and she vanquishes a troupe of warriors in a martial arts display set to "2000 Watts" and "Jam." Then, Smarty Pants, the de facto leader of the four, puts on Jackson's hat and is imbued with the artist's legendary gracefulness in "Smile." Finally, Sneaky, the troublemaker, performs a playful manipulation act with the rogue glove to "This Place Hotel" and "Workin' Day and Night."

Characters
 Michael Jackson - the misfits' spirit guide
 Mephisto - the antagonist who represents the paparazzi and tabloid media
 Clumsy - the misfit who gains balance with Jackson's white socks and black loafers
 Shy - the misfit who uses Jackson's sunglasses to overcome her introversion
 Smarty Pants - the de facto leader of the misfits; uses Jackson's fedora to display gracefulness
 Sneaky - the troublemaking misfit who performs a playful manipulation act using Jackson's sparkly glove
 Various villains - opponents whom the misfits encounter and must defeat to complete their adventurous journey
 Warriors - The Heroes of The Show that utilize the white jackets and white fedoras to defeat the Mephisto

Setlist
 "Privacy" (Pre-show music)
 "The Vortex" (Video interlude)*
 "Beat It"
 "Leave Me Alone" / "Tabloid Junkie" / "2 Bad"
 "Stranger in Moscow" / "Will You Be There"
 "Bad"
 "Smooth Criminal"
 "I'll Be There"
 "Human Nature" / "Never Can Say Goodbye"
 "2000 Watts" / "Jam"
 "They Don't Care About Us"
 "Planet Earth" / "Earth Song"
 "Smile"
 "Wanna Be Startin' Somethin'"
 "PYT (Pretty Young Thing)" / The Way You Make Me Feel" / "You Rock My World"
 "Dangerous" / "Dirty Diana"
 "This Place Hotel" (instrumental) / "Workin' Day and Night"
 "Billie Jean"
 "Scream"
 "Thriller"
 "Speechless" 
 "I Just Can't Stop Loving You"
 "Man in the Mirror"
 "Can You Feel It"
 "Black or White"
 "Don't Stop 'Til You Get Enough" (Curtain call music)
 "Remember the Time" (Post-show music pre-2014)
 "Love Never Felt So Good" (Post-show music from 2014 on)

*Also includes: "Ghosts" / "Somebody's Watching Me" / "In the Closet" / "Why You Wanna Trip on Me"

Acts

Vortex - Intro
Beat It - Dance Number
Leave Me Alone/Tabloid Junkie/2 Bad - Dance Number
Stranger in Moscow - Spanish Web
Bad - Slack line
Smooth Criminal - Japanese Men's Rhythmic Gymnastics 
Human Nature - Contortion
Jam - Martial Arts
They Don't Care About Us - March Routine
Earth Song - Shadow Puppets
Smile - Solo Dance
Wanna Be Startin' Somethin' - Trapeze Duet
The Way You Make Me Feel - Dance Number
Dirty Diana - Pole Dance
This Place Hotel - Glove Manipulation
Billie Jean - Glow-in-the-dark Dance Routine
Scream - Video Projection
Thriller - Trampoline
Speechless - Interlude
I Just Can't Stop Loving You - Spanish Web
Man in the Mirror - Dance Number
Black or White - Finale

References

External links

Cultural depictions of Michael Jackson
Cirque du Soleil resident shows
Production shows in the Las Vegas Valley
Mandalay Bay
Las Vegas shows